Jorge Andújar Moreno (born 26 April 1987), known as Coke, is a Spanish professional footballer who plays as a right-back for UD Ibiza.

He began his career at Rayo Vallecano, who he helped rise from Segunda División B into La Liga, totalling 204 official appearances. In 2011 he joined Sevilla, with whom he won the Europa League three times.

Club career

Rayo Vallecano
Born in Madrid, Coke was a product of Rayo Vallecano's youth system, being promoted to the main squad for the 2005–06 season at only 18, with the capital club in the Segunda División B. He helped it achieve promotion in his third year, and played 33 matches the following campaign as the team overachieved for a final fifth place (scoring three goals in as many wins, including the game's only at home against Hércules CF on 7 February 2009).

Coke only missed 11 league games out of 84 the next two Segunda División seasons and scored 12 goals, with Rayo achieving promotion to La Liga by finishing second in 2011.

Sevilla
In early June 2011, Coke signed with fellow league club Sevilla FC, penning a four-year contract. He made his top flight debut on 28 August, coming on for Fernando Navarro at half-time of the 2–1 home win against nearby Málaga CF. He finished his first year with 32 appearances in all competitions.

Coke scored his first league goal with the Andalusians on 17 March 2013, grabbing a brace in a 4–0 home rout of Real Zaragoza. On 14 May of the following year, he played the full 120 minutes and converted his penalty shootout attempt in the final of the UEFA Europa League against S.L. Benfica, as Sevilla went on to win the trophy.

After the departure of Ivan Rakitić to FC Barcelona, Coke captained the team in the 2014 UEFA Super Cup on 12 August, a 2–0 defeat to Real Madrid at Cardiff City Stadium. He featured less throughout the season as new signing Aleix Vidal was reconverted to right-back by coach Unai Emery, but played 32 minutes as they retained their Europa League crown with a 3–2 victory over FC Dnipro on 27 May 2015.

On the final day of the 2015–16 campaign, Coke was the first of three players sent off in a 3–1 loss at Athletic Bilbao, being shown a red card for dissent despite not leaving the substitutes' bench. On 18 May 2016, in the Europa League final, he started as right midfielder in place of the injured Michael Krohn-Dehli and scored twice in a 3–1 defeat of Liverpool in Basel, being subsequently named Player of the match.

Schalke 04
On 31 July 2016, Coke signed for German club FC Schalke 04 on a three-year contract for a reported €5 million. During a friendly with Bologna F.C. 1909 held the following week, he suffered a severe cruciate ligament injury to his right knee.

Coke finally made his Bundesliga debut on 1 April 2017, starting in a 1–1 home draw with Borussia Dortmund in the Revierderby. He scored his first goal for the Gelsenkirchen club 15 days later, equalising in a 2–1 loss at Darmstadt 98.

Levante
On 16 December 2017, struggling with injury problems and lack of playing time, Coke returned to Spain and joined Levante UD on loan until the following 30 June. Subsequently, the move was made permanent on a four-year deal for an undisclosed fee estimated around €1.5 million. He was sent off on 2 September 2018 in a 2–2 home draw with city rivals Valencia CF.

Ibiza
On 1 September 2022, free agent Coke signed a one-year contract with UD Ibiza.

Career statistics

Honours
Rayo Vallecano
Segunda División B: 2007–08

Sevilla
UEFA Europa League: 2013–14, 2014–15, 2015–16
Copa del Rey runner-up: 2015–16
UEFA Super Cup runner-up: 2014, 2015

References

External links

Sevilla official profile

1987 births
Living people
Spanish footballers
Footballers from Madrid
Association football defenders
La Liga players
Segunda División players
Segunda División B players
Rayo Vallecano B players
Rayo Vallecano players
Sevilla FC players
Levante UD footballers
UD Ibiza players
Bundesliga players
FC Schalke 04 players
UEFA Europa League winning players
Spain youth international footballers
Spanish expatriate footballers
Expatriate footballers in Germany
Spanish expatriate sportspeople in Germany